Han Deok-kwang (Hangul: 한덕광; born 12 March 1995), better known by his stage name Hash Swan (Hangul: 해쉬스완) is a South Korean rapper. He was a contestant on Show Me the Money 5 and Show Me the Money 6. He released his first EP, Hash X Kash, on 28 September 2016.

Discography

Extended plays

Singles

References

External links
 

1995 births
Living people
South Korean male rappers
South Korean hip hop singers
21st-century South Korean  male singers